The Ingram Model 6 is a .45 ACP caliber submachine gun that was designed by Gordon B. Ingram and manufactured from 1949 through 1952 by the Police Ordnance Company of Los Angeles, California, US.

Overview
Although the Model 6 has an appearance similar to the Thompson submachine gun, it was intended to be sold as a low cost alternative for domestic law enforcement agencies in the United States. Normally produced with a wood stock, pistol grip and front grip, the overall length is approximately 30" with the barrel being 9". The magazine is a stick design with a capacity of 30 rounds.

Variants
A Model 7 version was made in 1952, the difference being that it was able to fire from a closed bolt and having a fire mode selector on. Only a few of these were made in the 1950s.

External links
 Modern Firearms
 Ingram Model 6: Like A Thompson Without the Price Tag (Sort Of)

.38 Super submachine guns
.45 ACP submachine guns
9mm Parabellum submachine guns
Police weapons
Submachine guns of the United States